The Alabama State Hornets are the college football team representing the Alabama State University. The Hornets play in NCAA Division I Football Championship Subdivision (FCS) as a member of the Southwestern Athletic Conference (SWAC).

Hornet Stadium serves as the facility for Alabama State football games and practices. The 120-yard field turf playing field provides training to ASU football in all weather conditions. In June 2011, construction on the Houston Markham Football Complex was completed. The two-story, 30,000-square-foot facility serves as the new home of the football program.

Conference affiliations
 Independent (1901–1912)
 Southern Intercollegiate Athletic Conference (1913–1975)
 Division II Independent (1976–1981)
 Southwestern Athletic Conference (1982–present)

Championships

Conference
Alabama State has won six conference championships.

Rivalries
The Magic City Classic is the highest attended and most anticipated regular season ASU football game every year.  The Hornets take on in-state rival Alabama A&M Bulldogs in Birmingham, Alabama.

The Turkey Day Classic is an annual event played yearly on Thanksgiving between ASU and another opponent, most recently Prairie View A&M in 2019 and has been played almost consecutively since 1924, except for 2020 due to the COVID-19 pandemic.

Alumni in the NFL
Over 20 Alabama State alumni have played in the NFL, including:
Reggie Barlow
Brad Baxter
Earl Cochran
Michael Coe
Isaiah Crowell
Tytus Howard
Johnny Huggins
Tarvaris Jackson
Greg Jenkins
Bill Johnson
Terren Jones
Zefross Moss
Eddie Robinson
Tyrone Rogers
Ricky Smith
 Jylan Ware

Head Coaches

Notes
 At an unknown point in the 1944 season, Georgie Lockhart was replaced by E.B. Campbell. Both coaches share credit for the 1944 season.

References

External links
 

 
American football teams established in 1901
1901 establishments in Alabama